The 2nd Central Committee of the Lao People's Revolutionary Party (2nd CC LPRP) was elected by the 2nd National Congress on 6 February 1972, and remained in session until the election of the 3rd Central Committee on 27 April 1982. In between convocations of the party congresses the Central Committee is the highest decision-making institution in the party. The 2nd Central Committee was not a permanent institution and delegated day-to-day work to elected central guidance bodies, such as the Politburo and the Secretariat. It convened meetings, known as "Plenary Session of the 2nd Central Committee", to discuss major policies. The 2nd CC was composed of 23 members and 6 alternates, and at its 1st Plenary Session on 6 February 1972 it elected a seven-man 2nd Politburo, a four-man 2nd Secretariat and elected Kaysone Phomvihane to the office General Secretary of the Central Committee. As well as electing the party's central bodies, the 2nd National Congress formulated the general party line of the 2nd CC. The line reaffirmed the party's commitment to the theories of national people's democratic revolution in Laos and of constructing socialism by bypassing capitalism.

Members

Alternates

References

Bibliography
 
 
  
 
 

2nd Central Committee of the Lao People's Revolutionary Party
1972 establishments in Laos
1982 disestablishments in Laos